Libčany is a municipality and village in Hradec Králové District in the Hradec Králové Region of the Czech Republic. It has about 900 inhabitants.

Administrative parts
The village of Želí is an administrative part of Libčany.

Notable people
Matěj Kopecký (1775–1847), puppeteer

Twin towns – sister cities

Libčany is twinned with:
 Le Mêle-sur-Sarthe, France

References

External links

Villages in Hradec Králové District